The 2021 Club Deportivo Universidad Católica season is the 81st season and the club's 47th consecutive season in the top flight of Chilean football. In addition to the domestic league, Universidad Católica are participating in this season's editions of the Copa Chile, the Supercopa de Chile, and the Copa Libertadores.

Squad

Transfers

In

Out

Loans out

New contracts

Competitions

Overview

Primera Division

League table

Results summary

Results by round

Matches

Supercopa de Chile

Copa Chile

Second round

Round of 16

Copa Libertadores

Group stage

The group stage draw was held on 15 April 2021.

Knockout phase

Round of 16
The draw for the round of 16 was held on 1 June 2021.

Statistics

Squad statistics

† Player left Universidad Católica during the season

Goals

Last updated: December 2021 
Source: Soccerway

Assists

Last updated: December 2021
Source: Soccerway

Clean sheets

Last updated: December 2021 
Source: Soccerway

Disciplinary record 

Last updated: December 2021
Source: Soccerway

Notes

References

External links

2021